Psylla buxi, known generally as the boxwood psyllid or box sucker, is a species of plant-parasitic hemipteran in the family Psyllidae. It is native to Europe and introduced to North America.

The psyllid causes cabbage-like leaf clusters, known as galls at the tips of box shoots. The leaves are slightly thicker and strongly concave, and in the summer conceal many pale green nymphs, which are coated with white wax.

References

Further reading

External links
 Plant parasites of Europe

Psyllidae
Galls
Hemiptera of Europe
Hemiptera of North America
Insects described in 1758
Taxa named by Carl Linnaeus